Our Beautiful Days or Our Best Days  (translit. Ayyamna al-Holwa) is a 1955 Egyptian romance/musical film directed and co-written by the Egyptian film director and writer Helmy Halim. It starred Abdel Halim Hafez, Ahmed Ramzy, Omar Sharif, and Faten Hamama. In 1996, during the Egyptian Cinema centennial, this film was selected one of the best 150 Egyptian film productions.

Plot 
Faten Hamama plays Hoda, a poor woman who leaves an orphanage to live with three young men (Ahmed, Ali, and Ramzi) in a room on a building rooftop. The three of these men fall in love with her, but she prefers Ahmed, who is played by Omar Sharif, and the others accept that and stay loyal to their friendship. When, one day, Hoda gets sick, the three men urgently work hard to gather enough money to pay for her surgery. The film is not conclusive about what happens to Hoda, but she is supposed to live with her sickness for the rest of her life and can hardly work or get married. What the film shows is the love and fraternity that is created in her friends through her sickness.

Main cast 
Faten Hamama as Hoda
Omar Sharif as Ahmed
Abdel Halim Hafez as Ali
Ahmed Ramzy as Ramzy
Zahrat El-Ola as salwa
Zeinat Sedki as zanouba

References

External links 
 

1955 films
1950s Arabic-language films
1955 musical comedy films
1955 romantic comedy films
1950s romantic musical films
Egyptian musical comedy films
Egyptian romantic comedy films
Egyptian romantic musical films
Egyptian black-and-white films